The Deer Lake Red Wings are a senior ice hockey team based in Deer Lake, Newfoundland and Labrador as a part of the West Coast Senior Hockey League.

Notable players
Darren Langdon, former NHL player. He played 521 games in the NHL with the New York Rangers, Carolina Hurricanes, Vancouver Canucks, Montreal Canadiens and New Jersey Devils.
Harold Druken, former NHL player. He played 146 games in the NHL with the Vancouver Canucks and Toronto Maple Leafs.

See also
List of ice hockey teams in Newfoundland and Labrador

External links 
Official website for the Deer Lake Red Wings

Defunct Ice hockey teams in Newfoundland and Labrador
Ice hockey in Newfoundland and Labrador